Thomas Handschin (born 28 November 1973) is a Swiss bobsledder. He competed in the four man event at the 1998 Winter Olympics.

References

External links
 

1973 births
Living people
Swiss male bobsledders
Olympic bobsledders of Switzerland
Bobsledders at the 1998 Winter Olympics
People from Winterthur
Sportspeople from the canton of Zürich
20th-century Swiss people